Jejune was an American rock band formed in 1996 at Berklee College of Music in Boston, Massachusetts. The band has been commonly identified with the emo genre, and was heavily involved with the scene at the peak of the "second wave" of emo in the mid-1990s. The three founding members, Arabella Harrison (Bass/Vocals), Joe Guevara (Guitar/Vocals) and Chris Vanacore (Drums), met while studying at the college.  The band relocated to San Diego, California, in 1997.

History 
Jejune formed in 1996 at Berklee College of Music in Boston, Massachusetts.

The band continued recording demos with the expectation of eventually recording their debut album, but ending up issuing a compilation of those demos as their first album, Junk, in 1997. A split single with Jimmy Eat World, including the song "Early Stars", was released in early 1998.

Breakup
Near the end of 1999, many of the bands in the "indie emo" scene of the time attempted to move away from the "emo" label. As a band, Jejune began experimenting with more pure-pop leanings, and prepared to record their third album.  However, tensions in the band regarding the new direction led to the band's breakup in early 2000. Later that year, Big Wheel Recreation released a compilation called RIP, which consisted of the completed demos for the third album, tracks from released singles, and a handful of unreleased songs.

Following the breakup of the band, Guevara, Murino, and Vanacore founded Lovelight Shine. That group released on EP through Big Wheel Recreation, and a second, self-released EP before breaking up. Following that, Murino and Vanacore went on to form the group Dirty Sweet, while Guevara has been playing piano for blues artist Lady Dottie. Harrison joined The And/Ors following the breakup, and  more recently, has embarked on a solo career, with Vanacore occasionally joining her on drums. She also plays as a member of the group Bartender's Bible.

Style 
The band's earliest songs consisted of a more punk rock style, such as on their first single, "Drive by Negly". 

Later in 1998, the band released their second album, This Afternoon's Malady, which marked a notable departure from the band's more indie rock leanings on their debut.

Tours
Over the span of their existence, the band undertook several tours of the US, including stints with The Get Up Kids, Blacktop Cadence, Braid, Piebald, and a late 1998 tour with Jimmy Eat World. In early 1999, the band added Mark Murino on second guitar in order to expand their live sound.  Not long after, the band undertook a European tour with Kill Holiday.

Members
 Arabella (Araby) Harrison – vocals/bass
 Joe Guevara – vocals/electric guitar
 Chris Vanacore – drums
 Mark Murino – guitar (1999–2000)

Discography
Albums
 Junk (1997)
 This Afternoon's Malady (1998)
 RIP (2000)

Singles
 Split 7" with Garden Variety (1996)
 Split 7" with Jimmy Eat World (1998)
 Split 7" with Lazycain (1999)
 Split 7" with Dignity for All (2000)

References

American emo musical groups
Indie rock musical groups from Massachusetts
Musical groups from Massachusetts